Pokrovske Raion was a raion (district) of Dnipropetrovsk Oblast, southeastern-central Ukraine. Its administrative centre was located at the urban-type settlement of Pokrovske. The raion was abolished on 18 July 2020 as part of the administrative reform of Ukraine, which reduced the number of raions of Dnipropetrovsk Oblast to seven. The area of Pokrovske Raion was merged into Synelnykove Raion.

At the time of disestablishment, the raion consisted of three hromadas:
 Malomykhailivka rural hromada with the administration in the selo of Malomykhailivka;
 Pokrovske settlement hromada with the administration in Pokrovske;
 Velykomykhailivka rural hromada with the administration in the selo of Velykomykhailivka.

References

Former raions of Dnipropetrovsk Oblast
1923 establishments in Ukraine
Ukrainian raions abolished during the 2020 administrative reform